The following is a list of people from McPherson County, Kansas. Inclusion on the list should be reserved for notable people past and present who have resided in the county, either in cities or rural areas.

Academic

 John Frykman, Lutheran minister and psychotherapist specializing in brief therapy
 Kevin Honeycutt,  the creator of "Artsnacks" learning community and international keynote speaker on technology, education and cyber-bullying prevention
 Wendell Johnson, psychologist, actor and author; was a proponent of General Semantics 
 Stanford Lehmberg, historian
 Emory Lindquist, president of Bethany College and Wichita State University
 Harvey Harlow Nininger, meteorite collector, self-taught meteorologist, educator; considered by many today to be the "father of modern meteoritics"
 David Nyvall, Swedish immigrant to the United States and church leader; helped shape the Evangelical Covenant Church and establish North Park University in Chicago

Arts
 Chris Arpad, solo steel pannist, entertainer, musician, Scottish Highland drummer
 Bruce Conner, artist of multiple mediums
 Harrison Keller, violinist and music educator
 Robert Leaf, composer
 Bruce Montgomery, entertainer
 John W. Peterson, composer
 John Pfeiffer, classical recording producer
 Birger Sandzen, artist
 Gordon Young, composer

Crime
 Duane Earl Pope, convicted murderer

Politics
 Jim Francisco, Kansas Lieutenant Governor
 Dick Nichols, US Representative

Sports
See also List of Bethany Terrible Swedes head football coaches and List of McPherson Bulldogs head football coaches
 Montee Ball, running back for the Denver Broncos
 Jonathan Coachman, sports commentator for ESPN
 Marlies Gipson, professional basketball player
 Kent Kessinger, college football head coach at Ottawa University
 Ted Kessinger, member of College Football Hall of Fame
 Laurie Koehn, professional basketball player
 Del Lundgren, major league baseball pitcher
 Stewart Stover, linebacker for the Kansas City Chiefs
Brad Underwood, college basketball head coach at Illinois

Others
  Pop Hollinger, one of the first to begin collecting comic books for resale, went to college and played football at McPherson College

See also

 Lists of people from Kansas

References

McPherson County